The 1962 South Dorset by-election occurred following the death of George Montagu, 9th Earl of Sandwich on 15 June 1962. His son Viscount Hinchingbrooke, the incumbent MP for the constituency of South Dorset, was subsequently elevated to the peerage, becoming the 10th Earl of Sandwich. Following the Peerage Act 1963, the 10th Earl disclaimed his peerages in 1964, becoming Victor Montagu, but never sat in the House of Commons again.

Candidates
The campaign coincided with a period when the United Kingdom was negotiating to join the European Communities ("Common Market"). The application was later vetoed by Charles de Gaulle in 1963. Viscount Hinchingbrooke was staunchly against joining the Common Market, while the Conservative candidate, Angus Maude, had to back the official party pro-Common Market policy. The issue resulted in a local Conservative, Sir Piers Debenham, standing as an anti-Common Market candidate with the support of Viscount Hinchingbrooke.

Independent candidates Burn, Fudge and O'Connor were all serving in the British Armed Forces. The law stated that, on standing in a Parliamentary election, they would be released from the Forces; this was, therefore, a way to receive an early honourable discharge, for the cost of a lost deposit. The practice was banned the following year.

A total of seven candidates stood for election; this matched the then by-election record, which had been set at the 1920 Stockport by-election, and was not beaten until the 1976 Walsall North by-election.

Result
The by-election took place on 22 November 1962, and resulted in a gain for the Labour Party from the Conservatives. Guy Barnett was elected with a majority of 704, overturning a 6,693 Conservative majority at the 1959 general election, and with 33.5% of the poll, one of the lowest winning vote-shares at a by-election vote. The 5,000 votes for Piers Debenham proved decisive, although the increase in the Liberal Party vote was also important. Debenham lost his deposit, gaining 12.3% of the votes against the 12.5% required.

Angus Maude was subsequently elected to Parliament in the Stratford by-election in 1963, after the resignation of John Profumo following the Profumo affair. At the 1964 general election Guy Barnett was defeated by the Conservative candidate Evelyn King by 935 votes. He returned to parliament in 1971, for Greenwich, following a by-election there. Piers Debenham died in 1964, just before the 1964 general election.

Votes

References

External links
Dorset’s first Labour MP

1962 in England
1962 elections in the United Kingdom
By-elections to the Parliament of the United Kingdom in Dorset constituencies
20th century in Dorset